On November 4, 1974, the District of Columbia held an election for its non-voting House delegate representing the District of Columbia's at-large congressional district. The winner of the race was Walter E. Fauntroy (D), who won his second re-election. Independent candidate James G. Banks surprised many by taking second place, ahead of William R. Phillips (R) and D.C. Statehood Party candidate Anton V. Wood.  All elected members would serve in 94th United States Congress.

The non-voting delegate is elected for two-year terms, as are all other Representatives and Delegates minus the Resident Commissioner of Puerto Rico, who is elected to a four-year term.

Candidates 
Walter E. Fauntroy, a Democrat, sought re-election for his third term to the United States House of Representatives. Fauntroy was opposed in this election by independent James G. Banks, who received 21.03% by taking many votes away from Republican challenger William R. Phillips and Statehood Party candidate Anton V. Wood who only received 8.81% and 2.92%, respectively.  This resulted in Fauntroy being elected with 63.78% of the vote.

Results

See also
 United States House of Representatives elections in the District of Columbia

References 

United States House
District of Columbia
1974